Kumovka is a rural locality (a khutor) in Pyatiizbyanskoye Rural Settlement, Kalachyovsky District, Volgograd Oblast, Russia. The population was 222 as of 2010. There are 3 streets.

Geography 
Kumovka is located 20 km southwest of Kalach-na-Donu (the district's administrative centre) by road. Dom otdykha is the nearest rural locality.

References 

Rural localities in Kalachyovsky District